Elections to Gosport Borough Council were held on 4 May 2000.  One third of the council was up for election and the council stayed under no overall control. Overall turnout was 29%.

After the election, the composition of the council was
Conservative 13
Labour 11
Liberal Democrat 6

Election result

Ward results

References
2000 Gosport election result
Ward results
Mayor loses as poll tide turns blue

2000
2000 English local elections
2000s in Hampshire